Phyllospadix iwatensis is a plant species found along the seacoasts of Japan, Korea, China (Hebei, Liaoning, Shandong), and the Russian Far East (Sakhalin, Primorye and the Kuril Islands). It was first discovered in 1929 near on the Miyako Peninsula in Iwate Prefecture in Japan, in northeastern Honshu. It occurs in the intertidal zone along the shore.

Phyllospadix iwatensis is a perennial herb spreading by means of rhizomes. Leaves are long and thin, up to 150 cm long but rarely more than 5 mm across.

References

iwatensis
Salt marsh plants
Flora of Hebei
Flora of Liaoning
Flora of Shandong
Flora of Japan
Flora of Korea
Flora of Russia
Flora of China
Biota of the Pacific Ocean
Plants described in 1931